Fluoromedroxyprogesterone acetate (FMPA, 9α-fluoromedroxyprogesterone acetate, or 9α-FMPA) is a synthetic steroid medication which was under development by Meiji Dairies Corporation in the 1990s and 2000s for the potential treatment of cancers but was never marketed. It is described as an antiangiogenic agent, with about two orders of magnitude greater potency for inhibition of angiogenesis than its parent compound medroxyprogesterone acetate. FMPA showed about the same affinities for the progesterone and glucocorticoid receptors as MPA. It reached the preclinical phase of research prior to the discontinuation of its development.

See also
 Anecortave acetate

References

External links
 Fluoromedroxyprogesterone acetate (FMPA) - AdisInsight

Abandoned drugs
Acetate esters
Angiogenesis inhibitors
Drugs with unknown mechanisms of action
Experimental cancer drugs
Glucocorticoids
Pregnanes
Progestogen esters
Progestogens